Pterolophia subleiopodina is a species of beetle in the family Cerambycidae. It was described by Stephan von Breuning and Ohbayashi in 1964.

References

subleiopodina
Beetles described in 1964